Barton Hills could refer to:

 Barton Hills, Bedfordshire, England in the Chilterns near Barton-le-Clay (including a National Nature Reserve)
 Barton Hills, Michigan, United States
 Barton Hills, Austin, Texas, a neighborhood in Austin, Texas

See also

 Barton Hill (disambiguation)